Beb or BEB may refer to: 

Battery electric bus
Beach Erosion Board
Béb, Hungarian village
Bebele language of Cameroon ISO 639-3 code
Benbecula Airport IATA code 
Best of European Business
Binary exponential backoff, a congestion avoidance technique

As a nickname
Beb Bakhuys (1941–1980), French jazz double-bassist
Beb Guérin (1909–1982), Dutch football player and manager
Beb Vuyk (1905–1991), Dutch writer
Beryl Hearnden (1897–1978), English progressive farmer, journalist and author
Herbert Asquith (poet) (1881–1947), English poet, novelist, and lawyer